YBN University is located in Ranchi, Jharkhand, India. The main campus is in Namkum.

See also
Education in India
List of private universities in India
List of institutions of higher education in Jharkhand

References

External links

Universities in Jharkhand
Universities and colleges in Ranchi
2017 establishments in Jharkhand
Educational institutions established in 2017